Gregory Metcalfe ”Greg” Joujon-Roche (December 7, 1966 – July 31, 2016) was an American personal trainer and author who founded Holistic Fitness in Los Angeles in 1994.

Career
Joujon-Roche was born in Los Angeles, California and raised in Kauai, Hawaii. He later moved back to Los Angeles where he worked as a model and appeared in the 1989 direct-to-video horror film, Psycho Cop. In the early 90s, Joujon-Roche began working as a personal trainer and, in 1994, opened Holistic Fitness. His first celebrity client was actress Demi Moore who hired Joujon-Roche to get her into shape for the 1996 film Striptease. He went on to train other celebrities including actors Brad Pitt (for the 2004 film Troy), Tobey Maguire (for 2002's Spider-Man) and Leonardo DiCaprio, singers Gwen Stefani and Pink and supermodel Gisele Bündchen. He wrote a fitness book One Body, One Life : Six Weeks to the New You, released in April 2006. The following year, Joujon-Roche opened Real Raw Live, a juice bar, in Los Angeles.

In 2014, Joujon-Roche, his wife Irma and their two children relocated to Sydney, Australia where he opened a second Real Raw Live juice bar.

Death
On July 31, 2016, Joujon-Roche died of cholangiocarcinoma in Los Angeles at the age of 49.

References

External links
 Gregory Joujon-Roche's Holistic Fitness Gregory Joujon-Roche is the Founder of Holistic Fitness
 Gregory Joujon-Roche is a Diet and Fitness Coach at AOL Coaches

1966 births
2016 deaths
20th-century American businesspeople
20th-century American male actors
21st-century American businesspeople
21st-century American male writers
American exercise and fitness writers
American exercise instructors
American expatriates in Australia
American health and wellness writers
American male film actors
Businesspeople from Hawaii
Businesspeople from Los Angeles
Deaths from cancer in California
Deaths from cholangiocarcinoma
Male actors from Hawaii
Male actors from Los Angeles
Male models from California
Male models from Hawaii
People from Kauai
Writers from Los Angeles
Writers from Hawaii
21st-century American non-fiction writers
American male non-fiction writers